

List of Ambassadors

Orna Sagiv 2021-
Meir Shlomo 2017 - 
Simon Roded 2012 - 2017
Itzhak Shoham 2009 - 2012
Yael Rubinstein 2005 - 2009
Gershon Zohar 2002 - 2005
David Matnai 1997 - 2002
Mordechay Lewy 1994 - 1997
Uzi Manor 1991 - 1994
Benad Avital 1988 - 1991
Itzhak Navon 1984 - 1988
Avraham Cohen 1981 - 1984
Mordehai Lador 1979 - 1981
Reuben Dafni 1975 - 1979
Rehavam Amir 1971 - 1975
Daniel Levine (diplomat) 1969 - 1971
Abraham Darom 1965 - 1968
Yehiel Ilsar 1963 - 1965
Ambassador Mordechai Kidron (some sources say Mordecai) 1958 - 1963
Minister Joseph Ivor Linton (Non-Resident, Tokyo) 1954 - 1957

References 

Thailand
Israel